Camilla Sand (born 14 February 1986 in Als, Hadsund) is a Danish football midfielder. She currently plays for Fortuna Hjørring and the Danish national team.

References

Danish Football Union (DBU) statistics

1986 births
Living people
Danish women's footballers
Denmark women's international footballers
Fortuna Hjørring players
People from Mariagerfjord Municipality
Women's association football defenders
2007 FIFA Women's World Cup players
Sportspeople from the North Jutland Region